Dùn Cholla is a hill fort located on the Inner Hebridean island of Colonsay, Scotland.

According to tradition it was a fort of Colla Uais after being exiled from Ireland in 310. St. Columba established his first church in Scotland in the shadow of Dùn Cholla.

Citations

External links

Archaeological sites in the Southern Inner Hebrides
Hill forts in Scotland
Colonsay
Former populated places in Scotland
Scheduled monuments in Scotland